Beverley/Linley Hill Airfield  is an unlicensed aerodrome located  north-east of Beverley, East Riding of Yorkshire, England.

Beverley/Linley Hill had a CAA Ordinary Licence (Number P762) that allowed flights for the public transport of passengers or for flying instruction as authorised by the licensee (Hull Aero Club Limited). The aerodrome was not licensed for night use. The aerodrome ceased to be licensed in 2011.

In January 2023 a planning application was approved by the East Riding of Yorkshire Council for a new hanger and facilities.

References

External links
Hull Aero Club

Airports in England
Transport in the East Riding of Yorkshire
Beverley
Airports in Yorkshire